Gündüz Gürol Azer (born 4 February 1980 in Istanbul) is a Turkish footballer who plays for Giresunspor in the TFF First League.

He previously played fullback for Çaykur Rizespor and Sivasspor in the Süper Lig.

References

1980 births
Living people
Turkish footballers
Turkey B international footballers
Turkey youth international footballers
Galatasaray S.K. footballers
Çaykur Rizespor footballers
Sivasspor footballers
Diyarbakırspor footballers
Kasımpaşa S.K. footballers
Giresunspor footballers

Association football defenders